Gronovia is a genus of flowering plants in the family Loasaceae, native to Mexico, Central America and northwest South America. They are annual climbing herbs with irritating stinging hairs.

Species
Currently accepted species include:

Gronovia longiflora Rose
Gronovia scandens L.

References

Loasaceae
Cornales genera